St. Mary's School, Chandigarh was founded by Paulose Mar Gregorios on 15 August 1989. It is an English medium co-educational institute and affiliated to CBSE (New Delhi). The school belongs to the Chandigarh Orthodox Syrian Church Society.

See also 
 List of Schools in India
 List of Christian Schools in India

References 

Private schools in Chandigarh
Christian schools in Chandigarh
2022 Annual day function videos